Parochromolopis is a genus of moths in the family Epermeniidae.

Species
Parochromolopis bicolor Gaedike & Becker, 1989
Parochromolopis floridana Gaedike, 1977
Parochromolopis fuscocostata Gaedike & Becker, 1989
Parochromolopis gielisi Gaedike, 2010
Parochromolopis mexicana Gaedike & Becker, 1989
Parochromolopis parishi Gaedike, 1977
Parochromolopis parva Gaedike & Becker, 1989
Parochromolopis psittacanthus Heppner, 1980
Parochromolopis syncrata (Meyrick, 1921) (originally in Epermenia)

References

 , 1977: Revision der nearktischen und neotropischen Epermeniidae (Lepidoptera). Beiträge zur Entomologie, 27 (2): 301-312. 
 , 2010: New and poorly known Epermeniidae from the Neotropis, Australis, Orientalis and Palaearctic Regions (Lepidoptera). Beiträge zur Entomologie 60 (1): 57-70.
 , 1989: New neotropical Epermeniidae (Lepidoptera). Beiträge zur Entomologie 39 (2): 227-236.
  1980: A new Parochromolopis (Epermeniidae) from Costa Rica.  Journal of the Lepidopterists' Society, 34(1): 48-50. Full article (PDF)

Epermeniidae